Subcancilla gigantea is a species of sea snail, a marine gastropod mollusk in the family Mitridae, the miters or miter snails.

Description
Subcancilla gigantea is one of the largest species in its family, reaching up to 18 cm in length. The shell is elongated, cylindrical, and slightly curved, with a pointed apex at one end and a wider aperture at the other end. Subcancilla gigantea is a carnivore that feeds on small invertebrates and other marine animals.

Distribution
Subcancilla gigantea is found in the Indo-Pacific region, from the Red Sea to Japan, and is typically found on sandy or muddy bottoms in shallow waters.

References

Mitridae
Gastropods described in 1844